Back to Earth may refer to:

 Back to Earth (Lisa Ekdahl album)
 Back to Earth (Cat Stevens album)
 Back to Earth (Battle album)
 Back to Earth (Rare Earth album)
 Back to Earth (Caligola album)
 "Back to Earth", a song by Cosmic Gate from the album No More Sleep, 2002
 "Back to Earth", a song by Steve Aoki featuring Fall Out Boy from the album Neon Future I, 2014
 Red Dwarf: Back to Earth, a three-part mini-series of the TV show Red Dwarf